Spartobranchus tenuis is an extinct species of acorn worms (Enteropneusta). It existed in the Middle Cambrian (505 million years ago). Petrified mark animals were found in British Columbia, Canada in the Burgess Shale formation. It is similar to the modern representatives of the family Harrimaniidae, distinguished by branching fiber tubes. It is a believed predecessor of Pterobranchia, but this species is intermediate between these two classes. Studies show that these tubes were lost in the line leading to modern acorn worm, but remained in the extinct graptolites and saving still perystozyabernyh.

Description 
Detailed analysis shows that Spartobranchus tenuis had a flexible body consisting of short proboscis, collar and narrow elongated stem that ended in a bulbous structure that may have served as an anchor.

References 
 Jean-Bernard Caron, Simon Conway Morris & Christopher B. Cameron. Tubicolous enteropneusts from the Cambrian period. Nature 495, 503–506 (28 March 2013) doi:10.1038/nature12017

External links 

Hemichordates
Cambrian animals
Cambrian genus extinctions